Tevita Taumoepeau (born 16 May 1974) is a former Tongan international  rugby union player. The final club he played for was  Worcester Warriors in the Aviva Premiership. He played  as a tighthead prop

Career
Taumoepeau joined Worcester during the summer of 2005 from French side Bourgoin. He made his debut in Worcester against Northampton Saints in the Powergen Cup and has been a consistent member of the squad throughout Worcester's league and cup campaigns.

Taumoepeau has also previously played for the Chiefs, the Blues, Northampton and Bourgoin.

The durable front row made his 150th appearance for Warriors against Nottingham in 2011

In 2012, Tevita was struck with a neck injury which left him with a disabled left hand due to a nerve injury. It forced him to retire at the age of thirty-eight.

References

External links
 Pacific Islanders Profile at PacificIslanders.co.nz
 Worcester Warriors Profile at Warriors.co.uk

1974 births
Tongan rugby union players
Living people
Rugby union props
Worcester Warriors players
Northampton Saints players
People from Haʻapai
Tonga international rugby union players
Pacific Islanders rugby union players
Tongan expatriate rugby union players
Expatriate rugby union players in New Zealand
Expatriate rugby union players in England
Expatriate rugby union players in France
Tongan expatriate sportspeople in New Zealand
Tongan expatriate sportspeople in France
Tongan expatriate sportspeople in England